The  is a railway line of the Kyoto Tango Railway  in Kyoto Prefecture and Hyōgo Prefecture, Japan. Trains on the line are operated by Willer Trains Inc. as part of its Kyoto Tango Railway system.

History

The Nishi-Maizuru - Miyazu section was opened in 1924 by the Japanese Government Railway, and extended west progressively, reaching Amino in 1926.

The Toyooka - Kumihama section opened in 1929, the Amino - Tango-Kanno section in 1931, and the line was completed in 1932 with the opening of the Kumihama - Tango-Kanno section

Freight services ceased in 1985, and in 1990 the Kitakinki Tango Railway commenced operating the line. It electrified the Amanohashidate - Miyazu section in 1996, enabling EMU services from the Miyafuku Line to service Amanohashidate Station.

On April 1, 2015, the train operation business of Kitakinki Tango Railway was transferred to Willer Trains, Inc., which named the railway system the Kyoto Tango Railway. At this time, the nicknames Miyamai Line and Miyatoyo Line were assigned to the line.

Former connecting lines
 Nodagawa station - The Kaya Railway Co. opened a 6 km line to its namesake town in 1926. In 1942 the line was extended 3 km to the Oeyama nickel mine, and a 4 km extension from Nodagawa to Iwataki built to service an ore treatment plant. Both extensions closed in 1946, and the original line closed in 1985.

Route data
Operating Company: 
Willer Trains (Category-2, Services)
Kitakinki Tango Railway (Category-3, Tracks)
Distance:
Toyooka — Nishi-Maizuru: 83.6 km
Gauge: 
Stations: 19
Double-tracking: None
Electrification: Amanohashidate - Miyazu (1500 VDC)
Railway signalling:
special automatic occlusive (electronic sign A review type)

Station list 
Legend: S - trains stop; | - trains pass

See also
 List of railway lines in Japan

References

This article incorporates material from the corresponding article in the Japanese Wikipedia

Railway lines in Japan
Rail transport in Kyoto Prefecture
Rail transport in Hyōgo Prefecture
Japanese third-sector railway lines